Châu Hoàng Tuyết Loan (born 18 February 1975) is a Vietnamese woman paralympic powerlifter. She contracted polio when she was four months old, and has been using a wheelchair since. She started weightlifting in 2001, at Nha Trang Fitness Club, and works as a restaurant manager. Loan competed in both Beijing 2008 and London 2012 paralympics.

References

External links
IPC Profile
Profile  on London2012.com/Paralympics

1975 births
Living people
Paralympic powerlifters of Vietnam
21st-century Vietnamese women